Bin Tepe is an archaeological site on the southern shore of Marmara Lake in Manisa Province, Turkey. Consisting of over 100 tumuli, it served as a cemetery for the elites of nearby Sardis.

Site 

Bin Tepe sits on a low limestone ridge to the north of Sardis. Its elevation and proximity to a major travel route made the tumuli conspicuous to ancient travellers, as they continue to be for modern visitors. The site's proximity to Bronze Age settlement mounds suggests that it may have been chosen to provide a symbolic link to the past. While there were once at least 149 tumuli at the site, there are now only around 115, the others having been destroyed for farmland.

The tumuli consist of stone burial chambers covered by large earthen mounds. The burial chambers were either constructed from slabs or cut into the bedrock, and were generally located off-center to deter grave robbers. The mounds were ringed with stone crepis walls which retained the dirt fill and gave the mound a defined edge, though many of these walls no longer survive.

The earliest of the Bin Tepe tumuli date from around 600 BC, seemingly adapted from Phrygian royal burials at Gordion. The style remained in use after the fall of the Lydian Empire, with many of the datable examples at Bin Tepe having been constructed during the Persian period. Tumuli remained a popular elite burial style in Anatolia throughout antiquity, though they coexisted with others such as rock-cut tombs and cist graves for the entirety of their use.

Major tumuli 

The Tumulus of  Alyattes (Koca Mutaf Tepe) is the largest at the site, with a height of 63m, a base diameter of 330m, and a total volume of 785,000 m3. It is generally accepted as the tomb of the Lydian king Alyattes who died in 560 BC. It has been estimated that it would have taken two and a half years to build with 2,400 labourers and 600 beasts of burden. The burial chamber is built from limestone and marble with a style of masonry which reflects Greek and Near Eastern influence. Despite being constructed to deter grave robbers, it was nonetheless heavily looted in antiquity. Few grave goods and no human remains have been found.

Two other tumuli of exceptional size were traditionally identified as tombs of other kings of the Mermnad dynasty, but these identifications are not accepted by modern scholars. The second largest tumulus (Koca Mutaf Tepe) is 53m tall, with a base diameter of 230m, its footprint roughly equal to that of the Great Pyramid at Giza. This tumulus was traditionally attributed to King Gyges, but pottery fragments in the mound show that it post-dates his reign by at least forty years. It appears to have been built over an unfinished smaller tumulus. Archaeologists have speculated that it may have been built for a queen, since its size suggests a royal burial and no other king of the relevant period is a plausible candidate.

Excavation history 

Bin Tepe has been a conspicuous feature of the landscape since its construction. The Tumulus of Alyattes was described by Herodotus in his Histories as follows:

The tumuli have been thoroughly looted since ancient times, destroying much of the archaeological evidence they once contained. The first systematic study was carried out by Prussian consul Ludwig Peter Spiegelthal, who excavated the Tumulus of Alyattes in 1853. Archaeological excavation of the other tumuli began in 1880 and continue to the present day. Despite the looters' destruction, remaining evidence has provided insight into Lydian society and beliefs. The tumuli are particularly important for our understanding of the Persian Period of Lydian history, which is much better attested at Bin Tepe than it is at Sardis itself.

See also
Limantepe
Karun treasure
Kaymakçı (archaeological site)
Troy

References

 
Archaeological sites in the Aegean Region
Archaeological sites in Turkey
Manisa Province